BD-1 may refer to:
Bede BD-1, a small aircraft
Agent Starr, a character in the 2006 rhythm video game Elite Beat Agents
BD-1, a character in the 2019 action-adventure video game Star Wars Jedi: Fallen Order